Strandloper  may refer to:

 Strandloper (novel), novel by English writer Alan Garner
 Strandloper (people), ethnic group of south-western Africa
 Harry die strandloper (fl. c.1625-1665), Khoikhoi tribal leader